Hyunmoo (Korean: 현무; Hanja: 玄武; literally "Black Tortoise" of Asian mythology, which stands for "Guardian of the Northern Sky") is a series of strategic missiles developed by South Korea.

The Hyunmoo includes the only ballistic missile reverse engineered by South Korea that was actually deployed. This missile improved the first stage propelling device that was a problem in the previous Baekgom missile. The first test-launch of the Hyunmoo was successful in 1982; the domestic political situation of South Korea delayed  the second test-launch until September 1985. The flight test was conducted by the Defense Systems Test Center (DSTC).

Hyunmoo-1 
Hyunmoo-1 is the first domestically-produced ballistic missile used by the South Korean Army. It was developed by the South Korean national Agency for Defense Development, and is based on the American 1960s Nike Hercules missile system; the US designates it as the Nike Hercules Korea (NHK-1).

The Hyunmoo system, which means "guardian angel of the northern skies" in Korean, launches a missile from a mobile launcher which is fire-controlled from the missile battery's command and control vehicle. It features an independent inertial guidance and control system which means it can reach any target in any weather conditions without further commands after launch.

In 1990 the US withheld approval on a request by South Korea to start selling the Hyunmoo-1 abroad. South Korea was permitted to produce a limited number of Hyunmoo missiles under US inspection until production ended.

Hyunmoo-2 

The Hyunmoo-2A was the first of South Korea's attempts to develop an newer indigenous ballistic missile with an increased range, over Hyunmoo-1. Due to an agreement in 2001 with the MTCR (Missile Technology Control Regime), the missile's range was limited to 300 km. It is carried by a 4 axle transporter erector launcher (TEL).

Eventually the missile range was increased to 800 km which spurred on the development of Hyunmoo-2B and Hyunmoo-2C.

South Korea released the upgraded version of Hyunmoo-2A, named Hyunmoo-2B, which was put into service in late 2009. This ballistic missile had an increased range of 500 km. If launched from the central region of South Korea, all of North Korean territory is under a 550-kilometer striking range. Its accuracy is 30 m circular error probable.

The upgraded version of Hyunmoo-2B, named Hyunmoo-2C, was unveiled in 2017. The ballistic missile has an increased range of 800 km, but with a warhead weight reduced by half, and uses a different type of TEL with 5 axles, and launch canister that is wider and longer, suggesting increased weight. The warhead section features maneuvering fins (similar to those on Pershing II), which suggests a maneuverable reentry vehicle or some type of terminal guidance for increased accuracy. It has extreme accuracy (circular error probable of 1–5 m), ideal as a bunker buster. If fired from southernmost Jeju Island, it can still reach all of North Korea but will be outside the range of North Korean Scud missiles.

The missile is suspected to be a derivative of the Russian Iskander missile. From video and pictures published by the South Korean military and media, the Hyunmoo-II missile's head is similar to the Russian Iskander missile and the double cone structure of China's M20 missile, missile shape and Iskander missile is very similar. Even the tail is the Iskander-style truncated delta wing. There is precedent for cooperation on missile technology between Russia and South Korea — Seoul's KM-SAM air-defence system is based on the Russian 9M96E missile developed for the S-400 Triumf (SA-21 "Growler") system — but there are also resemblances with the American ATACMS and Israeli LORA missiles.

Hyunmoo 4-4
On 7 September 2021, South Korea tested a submarine launched ballistic missile from a Dosan Ahn Changho-class submarine, making it the third country to develop a conventionally-armed SLBM capability after the Soviet Union (Golf-class submarine) and North Korea (Sinpo-class submarine). The missile was the Hyunmoo 4-4, a variant of the Hyunmoo-2B with a 500 km range.

Hyunmoo-3 

In 2006, the South Korean defense ministry released a statement that it had been testing several cruise missiles under the series of Hyunmoo-3 which were similar to the American Tomahawk. The first official model, Hyunmoo-3B, was unveiled in 2009 with an maximum range of 1,000 km meaning it could hit any part of North Korea as well as some parts of China and Tokyo.  Unlike Hyunmoo-2 missiles, the Hyunmoo-3 missiles would use cruise missile technology. It uses the same four axle TEL like the Hyunmoo 2.

The Hyunmoo-3C missile's deployment is still unknown. The missile would have an increased maximum range of 1,500 km. 

Hyunmoo-3D/Hyunmoo-4 are under speculation however work on such a missile is unlikely to occur any time soon due to regulations on missile range. Some cite its deployment for the late 2030s, however, such a missile is still a grey area to the public.

Hyunmoo-4 
While the South Korean military's missiles are currently capable of destroying out North Korean structures on land, it says it needs heavier warheads to be able to destroy North Korea's underground facilities and bunkers. The new Hyunmoo IV ballistic missile will likely be fitted with a new 1,000-kilogram (2,200-pound) warhead capable of destroying North Korea's underground military facilities, command centers and its leadership and is probably a variant of the extended-range Hyunmoo-2C missile currently under development. Seoul has reached a de facto deal with the U.S. to revise their missile development guidelines so that it can double the maximum payload of its ballistic missiles. Two Hyunmoo-4 missiles were test-fired in April 2020, with one of them misfiring.

Notable events 
On 23 June 2017, South Korea unveiled footage of a successful missile test launch of a Hyunmoo-2C missile. Unlike its predecessor, which had a maximum range of 500 km, the Hyunmoo-2C has a maximum range of 800 km and thus is capable of hitting any part of North Korea. South Korean President Moon Jae-in was shown to be observing the missile launch at the time.

On 4 July 2017, South Korea carried out a joint ballistic missile drill with the U.S. where they launched 2 Hyunmoo-2B missiles and 2 ATACMS missiles. The drill was seen as a response to North Korea's supposed successful test launch of an ICBM.

On 4 September 2017, U.S. President Trump agreed to lift the 500 kg limit on South Korea's missile warheads. This would allow South Korea to develop and deploy missiles with a warhead weighing up to 2,000 kg. This would enable South Korea to target and destroy virtually all of North Korea's underground facilities and hardened bunkers.

On 6 September 2017, South Korea's MoD announced the upcoming development of a new missile dubbed the "Frankenmissile." The Hyunmoo missile variant would carry a warhead weighing up to 1,000 kg and would be used to target key North Korean sites both above and underground.

During U.S. President Donald Trump's visit to Seoul in 2017, the U.S. and South Korea agreed to eliminate any limit on South Korean missiles.

During a military parade North Korea displayed a short range ballistic missile similar in design to the Hyunmoo-2 on 8 February 2018 that is thought to have been tested in August 2017, according to South Korean military source that disclosed details of the test to the Chosun Ilbo. Designated as KN-23 by the U.S. DoD, the missile was test fired on 4 May and 9 May 2019 where two missiles were launched in each of the tests.

Variants

Specifications

See also
 MIM-14 Nike Hercules Original missile Hyunmoo was modeled after
 KTSSM
 Korean People's Army Strategic Force
 South Korea Ballistic Missile Range Guidelines
 KN-23 North Korean equivalent
 Ghaznavi
 Abdali-I
 Shaheen-I
 J-600T Yıldırım
 SOM
 Bora
 Fateh-313
 Qiam 1
 Al-Hussein
 Nasr
 Zelzal
 Tondar-69
 Burkan-1

References

External links
Hyunmoo miniature model
Hyunmoo launch picture
Article on "Hyunmoo."
Hyumoo pictures at Globalsecurity.org
S.Korea's Cruise Missile Program Revealed
Seoul to Boost Defense Against N.Korean Nukes, Missiles
Design Characteristics of South Korea's Ballistic and Cruise Missiles

Ballistic missiles of South Korea
Tactical ballistic missiles
Post–Cold War weapons of South Korea
Short-range ballistic missiles
Military equipment introduced in the 1980s